Desmia bourguignoni is a moth in the family Crambidae. It was described by Jean Ghesquière in 1942. It is found in the former Katanga Province of the Democratic Republic of the Congo.

References

Moths described in 1942
Desmia
Moths of Africa